LP1 World Tour is the fifth concert tour by the British singer-songwriter Joss Stone, in support of her fifth album, LP1.

Setlist
You Had Me
Free Me 
Somehow
Last One to Know
Super Duper Love (Are You Diggin' on Me)
Boat Yard
Put Your Hands on Me/Baby Baby Baby
Tell Me What We're Gonna Do Now 
Drive All Night 
Landlord 
Don't Start Lying to Me Now 
Bruised but Not Broken 
Could Have Been You 
"Fell in Love with a Boy
Tell Me 'bout It 
Encore
"Take Good Care" 
Newborn 
Big 'Ol Game

Tour dates

Festivals and other miscellaneous performances

This concert is a part of Festival dos Oceanos.
This concert is a part of Rock in Rio.
This concert is a part of 11th Anniversary the Magazine QUEM.
This concert is a part of Sidney Myer Music Bowl.
This concert is a part of Terry Wogan's Children in Need.

References

External links
Joss Stone's Official Website

2011 concert tours